"Bangarang" is a song by American electronic music producer Skrillex.  It was released as a single from his EP of the same name. It features guest rap vocals from American hip hop recording artist Sirah. "Bangarang" intersperses Sirah's rap vocals throughout the song. The song's title and lyrics reflect the battle cry of the Lost Boys in the 1991 movie Hook.

"Bangarang" is one of Skrillex's most commercially successful singles. It has charted within the United States, United Kingdom, Australia, Austria, France, New Zealand, Norway and Sweden. A music video for the song premiered on February 16, 2012 via his official YouTube channel. "Bangarang" received airplay on some modern rock radio stations. The song won a Grammy Award for Best Dance Recording.

Sirah forgot to close the window before recording it, and thus birds are audible in the recording.

Critical reception
Jon Dollan from Rolling Stone noted "the laser-blasting inanity of the title track, which ends with someone bragging, 'I'm eating Fun Dip right now/Not givin' a fuck.' Not a bad credo for music that makes a disco sugar high feel downright pornographic". Garret Kamps from Spin gave the song a positive review, calling it a "massively enjoyable, massively concussive collection of blips and bursts that sounds like something Moby might hear in his head during a heart attack, so thoroughly and dyspeptically is dubstep's characteristic bass wobble distorted and pushed into the red. That remains [his] signature trick..."

Rolling Stone named the song the 22nd-best song of 2012.

Music video
A music video for the song premiered via YouTube on February 16, 2012. It depicts a group of three young boys robbing an ice-cream truck in an elaborate heist. During the robbery, the ringleader of the boys unintentionally causes ice-cream truck driver to lose his hand by forcefully slamming a door onto his wrist. He feels guilt over this, and finds himself unable to eat the stolen ice cream, which reminds him of the driver's severed hand. 

When his gang have grown up to adulthood, they perform a similarly elaborate heist on a group of bank robbers who have stolen several briefcases of cash. They succeed in stealing the cash, and the video concludes with the gang's leader leaving one of the cases with the ice-cream man, walking away happily eating the same ice cream.

Drawing from the song's 'Peter Pan/Hook' theme, the video features references to Captain Hook in the ice-cream truck driver's style of moustache, his right hand's tattoo of a crocodile and after the children's heist cause the loss of his hand, where it is replaced with a hook (Captain Hook's hand was cut off by Peter Pan and fed to the crocodile in the story before being replaced with a hook).

Track listing

Commercial performance
The song has charted in multiple countries worldwide, including Australia, Austria, Belgium, Canada, Finland, France, Netherlands, Norway, New Zealand, Sweden, the United Kingdom and the United States. In Australia, the song became a commercial success, reaching the top five within the ARIA Charts whilst spending more than 20 weeks within the top 50. It has also been certified 4× Platinum by the Australian Recording Industry Association (ARIA).

In the United States, the song entered the Billboard Bubbling Under Hot 100 chart at number four due to strong digital downloads. However, on the issue date of March 3, 2012, the song debuted at number 95 on the Billboard Hot 100. It since reached a peak of number 72 and spent more than 20 weeks on the chart. It has sold over one million copies in the US as of January 2013. In the United Kingdom, the song reached a peak of number 24 and spent a total of 16 weeks inside the UK top 40.

Charts and certifications

Weekly charts

Year-end charts

Certifications

References

2011 songs
2012 singles
Skrillex songs
Sirah (rapper) songs
Electronic rock songs
Moombahton songs
Grammy Award for Best Dance Recording
Song recordings produced by Skrillex
Big Beat Records (American record label) singles
Atlantic Records singles
Owsla singles
Songs written by Skrillex
Songs written by Sirah (rapper)